Rosario (Central Córdoba) is a railway station in Rosario, Santa Fe, Argentina. It is located at the junction of 27 de Febrero Boulevard and Juan Manuel de Rosas St., south of the city center.

The station was part of the Córdoba Central Railway (then added to Belgrano Railway network). Closed for passenger services since 1952, it was operated by freight rail transport company Trenes Argentinos Cargas until 2015.

History
The station served as a terminus of the Córdoba and Rosario Railway company, which laid down its first rails in 1888. The line went north to the city of Rafaela and then to Córdoba. In 1912, the company merged with the Córdoba Central Railway.

The central block of the Rosario station was completely destroyed by a fire on 31 December 1921. The reconstruction of the building was started almost immediately. It ended in 1926 with the construction of a characteristic cupola (dome-shaped vault), which has been preserved until the present.

In 1949 the government of Juan Perón nationalised the Argentine railways and reconfigured the lines. State-owned company Ferrocarriles Argentinos took over the Córdoba Central Railway, shutting down the passenger services handled by Rosario (Córdoba Central) and other stations, concentrating all of it at Rosario Oeste. Rosario Central Córdoba remained active for freight services only.

Starting in 2005, the terrains surrounding the station were employed to create an urban park ("Parque Hipólito Yrigoyen"). As part of the renewal of the area, the station was restored.

The station's building was also seat of the Asociación Rosarina Amigos del Riel (Rosario's Friends of the Rail Association), a railway advocacy and research non-profit organization. In August 2015, it was announced that the Argentine state will invest A$ 15 million in the refurbishment of the building.

Besides, the Government of Santa Fe plans to open a tram service between Rosario and Granadero Baigorria, with Rosario Central Córdoba as an intermediate stop.

Historic operators 
Companies that operated the Rosario (CC) train station since its inauguration were:

Bibliography
 British Railways in Argentina 1860-1948 by H.R. Stones, P.E. Waters & Associates, Bromley, Kent, England, 1993

References

Railway stations in Rosario, Santa Fe
Railway stations opened in 1888
Defunct railway stations in Argentina